The Black Tulip Festival is a 1920 German silent historical film directed by Marie Luise Droop and Muhsin Ertugrul and starring Theodor Becker, Carl de Vogt, and Meinhart Maur. It is based on the novel The Black Tulip by Alexandre Dumas.

Cast

References

Bibliography

External links

1920 films
Films of the Weimar Republic
German silent feature films
Films directed by Muhsin Ertuğrul
German black-and-white films
1920s historical films
German historical films
Films set in the 1670s
Films set in the Netherlands
Films based on works by Alexandre Dumas
1920s German films